The Tioronda Bridge once carried South Avenue in Beacon, New York, across Fishkill Creek. Built between 1869 and 1873 by the Ohio Bridge Company, it was demolished by the city in December 2006. The bridge had been listed on the National Register of Historic Places in 1976, but a decade later had deteriorated to the point that it had to be closed.

Three stone abutments laid in randomly coursed ashlar remain in the river, with one steel stringer and some utility pipes. The bowstrings, arched hollow tubes which once carried the load but later only became guardrails, were the bridge's distinctive structural feature.

It was one of the last remaining bowstring truss bridges in the United States, one of the oldest vehicular bridges in New York and one of the few 19th century iron bridges known to have been based on a patent model. Only one other bridge, over Sandy Creek in Allegheny County, Pennsylvania, is known to have been built from that model as the Ohio Bridge Company ceased operations in 1873, possibly due to that year's economic crisis.

The trusses themselves were preserved for possible ornamental use on a rebuilt bridge. However, it is not known when such rebuilding would take place, and the city's police and fire departments would like a rebuilt bridge to be wider than the current abutments and decking, still in place, would allow for.

See also
List of bridges documented by the Historic American Engineering Record in New York (state)
List of bridges on the National Register of Historic Places in New York
National Register of Historic Places listings in Dutchess County, New York

References

External links
Discussion concerning fate of the bowstring truss sections salvaged from the original Tioronda bridge

Road bridges on the National Register of Historic Places in New York (state)
Demolished bridges in the United States
Bridges completed in 1873
Beacon, New York
Historic American Engineering Record in New York (state)
National Register of Historic Places in Dutchess County, New York
Steel bridges in the United States
Bowstring truss bridges in the United States
Transportation buildings and structures in Dutchess County, New York